Sigaloseps is a genus of skinks which inhabit the moist, closed forest of southern New Caledonia.

Conservation status
There is some conservation concern for Sigaloseps because of mining activity taking place in the region.

Species
The following 6 species are recognized as being valid.

Sigaloseps balios 
Sigaloseps conditus 
Sigaloseps deplanchei  - Deplanche's shiny skink
Sigaloseps ferrugicauda 
Sigaloseps pisinnus 
Sigaloseps ruficauda 

Nota bene: A binomial authority in parentheses indicates that the species was originally described in a genus other than Sigaloseps.

Etymology
The specific name, deplanchei, is in honor of French naturalist Émile Deplanche.

References

Further reading
Bavay ARJB (1869). "Catalogue des Reptiles de la Nouvelle-Calédonie et description d'espèces nouvelles ". Mémoires Société linnéenne de Normandie 15: 1-37. (Lygosoma deplanchei, new species, p. 23). (in French).
Sadlier RA (1987). "A review of the scincid lizards of New Caledonia". Records of the Australian Museum 39 (1): 1-66. (Sigaloseps, new genus).
Sadlier RA, Bauer AM (1999). "The Scincid Lizard Genus Sigaloseps (Reptilia: Scincidae) from New Caledonia in the Southwest Pacific: Description of a New Species and Review of the Biology, Distribution, and Morphology of Sigaloseps deplanchei (Bavay)". Rec. Australian Mus. 51 (1): 83–91. (Sigaloseps ruficauda, new species, pp. 84–87, Figures 1–6).

 
Lizard genera
Taxa named by Ross Allen Sadlier
Skinks of New Caledonia